Ten non-ODI warm-up matches for the 2018 Cricket World Cup Qualifier were played on 27 February and 1 March 2018.

World Cup Qualifier
ICC World Cup Qualifier
Cricket World Cup Qualifier